Zoran Talić may refer to:
Zoran Talić (politician) (born 1983), politician from Bosnia and Herzegovina
Zoran Talić (athlete) (born 1990), athlete from Croatia